My Seven Sons is a 1970 Azerbaijani drama film. The film plot is written by Yusif Samedoglu based on his father poet Samed Vurgun's The Komsomol Poem which is about the events of the 1920s and the Soviet overtaking of Azerbaijan.

The title "Yeddi Oğul İstərəm" derives from Azerbaijani folklore clause Yeddi Oğul İstərəm, Bircə Dənə Qız Gəlin (meaning "I'd like seven sons and just one daughter"), usually said during the weddings, when the groom comes to the bride's house to pick her up. The movie was shot for the 50th anniversary of establishment of Soviet power in Azerbaijan.

Plot
This lyrical psychological film is about commitment to the Bolshevik revolution and its victory. The story is about seven youth who sacrifice everything for the good of people. They travel through the villages during the takeover of Azerbaijan by Bolsheviks in order to establish and strengthen the Soviet power. Events develop in Peykanli village.

Cast
 Hasan Mammadov as Bakhtiyar
 Anvar Hasanov as Jalal
 Elchin Mammadov as Mirpasha
 Abdul Mahmudov as Gasim
 Shahmar Alakbarov as Gazanfar
 Rafig Azimov as Shahsuvar
 Alasgar Ibrahimov as Zalimoglu
 Hasanagha Turabov as Geray bey
 Ismayil Osmanli as Kalantar
 Zemfira Ismayilova as Humay
 Hamlet Khanizadeh as Gizir

See also
 Azerbaijani films of the 1970s

Notes

External links

Soviet-era Azerbaijanian films
Azerbaijani-language films
Azerbaijanfilm films
Soviet drama films
1970 drama films
1970 films
Films directed by Tofig Tagizadeh
Azerbaijani drama films